was a Japanese Imperial prince and official in the court of Emperor Shōmu and Empress Kōken.

He was the father of Tachibana no Naramaro .

 738 (Tenpyō 10, 1st month): Moroe was created  Udaijin (Minister of the Right) in the Imperial court.
 740 (Tenpyō 12): Moroe put down a revolt by Fujiwara no Hirotsugu.
 742 (Tenpyō 14): The emperor sent Moroe to Ise to convey his appreciation to the kami.
 743 (Tenpyō 15): Moroe was elevated to a rank almost equal to Sadaijin (Minister of the Left).
 756 (Tenpyō-shōhō 8, 2nd month): Empress Kōken is informed that Sadaijin Moroe is contemplating revolt, but she refuses to credit the rumor; nevertheless, Moroe resigns.
 757 (Tenpyō-hōji 1): Moroe dies at age 74; and his rank is posthumously raised by the empress.

Moroe was a poet whose work is included in the Man'yōshū.

Family 
Father: Prince Minu (美努王)
Mother: Agata no Inukai no Michiyo
Wife: Fujiwara no Tabino (藤原多比能), daughter of Fujiwara no Fuhito
Son:  Tachibana no Naramaro
Unknown Concubine
Daughter:  Lady Teruyoru (照夜の前), married Fujiwara no Hosei

Notes

References
 Nussbaum, Louis-Frédéric and Käthe Roth. (2005).  Japan encyclopedia. Cambridge: Harvard University Press. ;  OCLC 58053128
 Titsingh, Isaac. (1834).  Annales des empereurs du Japon (Nihon Odai Ichiran).  Paris: Royal Asiatic Society, Oriental Translation Fund of Great Britain and Ireland. OCLC 5850691

684 births
757 deaths
Kuge
People of Nara-period Japan
Man'yō poets
Deified Japanese people